Byee is a rural locality in the South Burnett Region, Queensland, Australia.

The district name was applied by the Railways Department in 1915 when plans for the Murgon to Proston branch line extension were approved and under development.   The word Byee is derived from Aboriginal origin with connotations meaning Silver Leaf Ironbark Tree

History 

The branch railway from Murgon to Proston opened on 25 February 1923, with Byee the second station on the route after Barlil, although some services to Byee functioned prior to the entire line opening as that section had been completed.  A mixed service was provided three times a week between 1938 and 1964 utilising a rail motor service operated to and from Gympie.  In 1924 it was reported that the local Byee storekeeper Mr. W.J.Wrigely had been appointed postmaster, and also that the telegraph and telephone office was functioning, and that land had been reserved for the purpose of building a hotel (which never eventuated) 

A public hall was established at Byee in 1929 on land donated by E.D.Quinlan and was funded by local donations and fundraising efforts such as 
a dance held in the barn of a nearby property owned by A.Sempf. The hall became a popular local venue for regular dances and social functions.  The district had its own soccer and cricket teams which competed in South Burnett fixtures.

Telephone infrastructure was first extended to Byee in 1923 and was based at the local railway station which itself was only new.   

Children in the Byee district attended school at either Silverleaf State School, Barlil State School or Wheatlands State School.  Wheatlands State School is the only school that has remained open and functioning into the modern era.

A small village developed in Byee which included a shop, receiving depots and later, grain silos.  Most business revolved around the functions of the railway.

References 

South Burnett Region
Localities in Queensland